The 1965 Cleveland Browns season was the team's 16th season with the National Football League.
With an NFL-best 11–3 mark, the 1965 team finished just a shade better than the year before (10–3–1) and, just as they had in 1964, the Browns returned to the NFL Championship Game; however, this time, they lost 23–12 to the Green Bay Packers in the last title contest held before the advent of the Super Bowl. It would be the first of three straight NFL crowns for the Packers, who went on to win the first two Super Bowls as well.

With his partner at wide receiver, 1964 rookie sensation Paul Warfield, missing almost all of the season with a broken collarbone, Gary Collins stepped up and led the Browns with 10 touchdown receptions, just less than half of the team's total of 23.

Pro Football Hall of Fame running back Jim Brown, in what would turn out to be his final year before his unexpected retirement in the offseason, rushed for 1,544 yards, 98 more than the year before, and exceeded his TD total by 10, scoring 17 times. Quarterback Frank Ryan, who had thrown 25 TD passes in both 1963 and 1964, had just 18 in 1965 with 13 interceptions. His yardage was down considerably, too, to 1,751, as was his rating (75.3).

The Browns had a stretch in which they won nine of ten games, something the 1964 team did not come close to matching. And whereas the 1964 team needed to capture its regular-season finale to clinch the Eastern Conference title, the 1965 Browns claimed the championship with several weeks left, which explains why they were clobbered 42–7 in the next-to-last game by a Los Angeles Rams team that finished last in the Western Conference at 4–10; The Browns rested many of their starters and were just trying to get out of that game with no injuries.

Thus, the Browns could have very easily been 12–2. However, there was no such explanation for the Browns' only other one-sided loss, a 49–13 home decision to the St. Louis Cardinals. Although the Cards finished tied with the Philadelphia Eagles for next-to-last place in the East at 5–9, they were arguably the Browns' fiercest rival throughout the entire 1960s.

Offseason

NFL draft

Exhibition schedule

Notes:

 All times in North American Eastern Time.

There was a doubleheader on September 4, 1965 Giants vs Lions and Packers vs Browns.

Schedule

Notes:

 All times in North American Eastern Time. (UTC–4 and UTC–5 starting October 24)

Playoffs

Notes:

 All times in North American Eastern Time.

Personnel

Roster

Staff/coaches

Standings

References

External links 
 1965 Cleveland Browns at Pro Football Reference
 1965 Cleveland Browns Statistics at jt-sw.com
 1965 Cleveland Browns Schedule at jt-sw.com
 1965 Cleveland Browns at DatabaseFootball.com  
Season Results at Cleveland Browns.com

Cleveland
Cleveland Browns seasons
Cleveland Browns